Agroha, locally known as Ther, is an archaeological site located in Agroha, in the Hisar district of India.

Location 
The mounds are located about 1.5 km from the town of Agroha, 20 km from Hisar city and 190 km from New Delhi in Hisar district of Haryana, India. It lies on National Highway 9 (old NH-10).

Rediscovery and excavation 
The excavations first started in the year 1888-89 under C.J. Rogers. It restarted in the year 1978-79 by the Archaeological Department of Haryana under the supervision of J.S. Khatri and Acharya.

Belief 

The Agrawal community believes that the archaeological findings are related to their legendary founder — the king Agrasena, whose capital is said to have been at Agroha. Agrawal organizations such as Akhil Bharatiya Agrawal Sammelan and Agroha Vikas Trust have supported archaeological research at the site.

Historical significance 

According to the official website of Hisar, the excavations at Agroha belong to the period from the 3rd-4th century B.C. to the 13th-14th century A.D. A wall for defense, shrine cells and residential houses can be observed in the mound.

Notable artifacts 
Around seven thousand artefacts were recovered during the excavations.

Coins 
Silver and bronze coins belonging to different periods have been found at the site. The coins hoard includes four Indo-Greek coins, one punch-marked coin, and fifty-one coins of Agrodaka.  They belong to Roman, Kushana, Yaudheya and Gupta empire. Language used is Prakrit.

Seals 
Many seals have also been found. They are inscribed with words like Pitradutt, " Sadhu Vridhasya", "Shamkar Malasya", "Madrsya", etc.

Others 
Besides the numerous stone sculptures, iron and copper implements and beads of semi-precious stones have also been found.

See also 
 List of Indus Valley civilization sites
Agroha (town)
Agroha (temple complex)
Agrasena
 Buddhist pilgrimage sites in Haryana
 Buddhist pilgrimage sites
 Buddhist pilgrimage sites in India

References

Bibliography 

Tourist attractions in Hisar district
Archaeological sites in Haryana
Agroha (town)
Buddhist pilgrimage sites in India
Buddhist sites in India